Vanessa Lóes de Melo Lacerda  (born 26 November 1971) is a Brazilian actress. She is married to actor Thiago Lacerda, with whom she has three children. Lóes is the granddaughter of actress Lídia Mattos.

Filmography

Television

References

External links

1971 births
Brazilian film actresses
Brazilian television actresses
Actresses from Rio de Janeiro (city)
Living people